Tunneling or tunnelling may refer to:

 Digging tunnels (the literal meaning)
Hobby tunneling
 Quantum tunneling, the quantum-mechanical effect where a particle crosses through a classically forbidden potential energy barrier
 Tunneling (fraud), a fraud committed by a company's own management or by major shareholders
 Tunneling protocol, transmitting one computer network protocol that is encapsulated inside another network protocol

See also
 
 
 Tunnel (disambiguation)